Ascurra is a municipality located in the Santa Catarina state of Brazil. Ascurra has a strong Italian culture due to its colonization in 1876 by farmers from Welschtirol. Hermann Blumenau (1819–1899) named the municipality after a point in Serra do Ibitirapé, Paraguay of the same name that was taken by the Brazilian Army during the Paraguayan War in 1869.

Geography

The Itajaí-Açu River crosses Ascurra.

Economy

Mainly from the rice agriculture.

Transportation

Events

Per Tutti – A high Tirolean-influenced party that occurs between August and September.

References

Municipalities in Santa Catarina (state)